is a Japanese former  basketball player who played for Denso Iris of the Women's Japan Basketball League .  She also played for Japan women's national 3x3 team.

References

1990 births
Living people
Sportspeople from Okinawa Prefecture
21st-century Japanese women